Cecil Lawson (born 19 April 1944) is a Jamaican cricketer. He played in seventeen first-class and three List A matches for the Jamaican cricket team from 1971 to 1978.

See also
 List of Jamaican representative cricketers

References

External links
 

1944 births
Living people
Jamaican cricketers
Jamaica cricketers
Place of birth missing (living people)